Songvår Lighthouse is a coastal lighthouse in the municipality of Kristiansand in Agder county, Norway. The lighthouse was first built in 1888, and in 1955 a new lighthouse was constructed. The lighthouse was closed in 2004 and replaced with a smaller automated light tower, just southeast of the existing lighthouse.

The lights are on a 3 seconds on / 3 seconds off flashing sequence. The tower is white with one red stripe on it.

The previous lighthouse is still standing, but it has not been used since 2004. That lighthouse was built in 1955. The building is now restored by Søgne municipality and it can be rented for overnight stays. The site is only accessible by boat. The ruins of the foundation of the 1888 (original) lighthouse can still be seen near the newer lighthouse.

See also
Lighthouses in Norway
List of lighthouses in Norway

References

Lighthouses in Agder
Kristiansand